Joseph Vance Ferguson (born September 19, 1946) is an American former professional baseball player and coach. He played as a catcher in Major League Baseball from 1970 to 1983  for the Los Angeles Dodgers, St. Louis Cardinals, Houston Astros, and the California Angels. After his playing career, Ferguson became a coach and minor league manager.

Career

Prior to his professional baseball career, Ferguson played baseball but also basketball at the University of the Pacific in Stockton, CA. In fact, he played in the West Regional Final in March of 1967, where Pacific fell to eventual National champion UCLA, led by sophomore Kareem Abdul-Jabbar.

Ferguson reached the majors in 1970 with the Los Angeles Dodgers, becoming their everyday catcher in 1973. He set a major league record for catchers by committing only three errors, leading the National League catchers in fielding percentage (.996) and double plays (17), while hitting .263 with a .369 on-base percentage. He also reached career-highs in games played (136), home runs (25), RBI (88), runs (84), doubles (26) and walks (87).

When Steve Yeager became a regular in the 1973 midseason, Ferguson shared catching duties and played right field against left-handed pitchers.  He soon became known for having one of the strongest throwing arms of any outfielder in the major leagues.  This came into play during Game One of the 1974 World Series against the Oakland Athletics, when Ferguson made a memorable play in right field in the top of the eighth inning, running in front of teammate Jimmy Wynn to catch a fly ball off the bat of Reggie Jackson, and then firing a 300-foot strike to Yeager to gun down Sal Bando, who was trying to score from third base.  In Game Two, Ferguson hit a two-run homer off Vida Blue to provide the only Dodgers' victory in the Series. He enjoyed another fine season in 1977 with Houston, catching 122 games and hitting 16 home runs with 61 RBI and a .379 OBP. Reacquired by the Dodgers in the 1978 midseason, he helped his team reach the 1978 World Series.

After retiring, he coached at the major league level with the Texas Rangers (1986–87), working under former Dodger teammate Bobby Valentine, and the Dodgers (1988–94). He also managed in the Dodgers, Baltimore Orioles and San Diego Padres minor league systems. He managed the Camden Riversharks Atlantic League baseball team in New Jersey for 3 seasons from 2007 - 2009.

In a 14-season career, Ferguson was a .240 hitter with 122 home runs and 445 RBI in 1013 games. In 13 postseason games, he hit .200 (7-for-35) with one home run and four RBI.

References

External links
  
Baseball Gauge
Joe Ferguson MLB - Baseballbiography.com
Camden Riversharks website
Retrosheet
Venezuelan Professional Baseball League

1946 births
Living people
Albuquerque Dodgers players
Albuquerque Dukes players
Arizona Instructional League Dodgers players
Baseball players from San Francisco
California Angels players
Daytona Beach Dodgers players
Houston Astros players
Leones del Caracas players
American expatriate baseball players in Venezuela
Los Angeles Dodgers coaches
Los Angeles Dodgers players
Major League Baseball bench coaches
Major League Baseball catchers
Major League Baseball first base coaches
Major League Baseball right fielders
Minor league baseball managers
Pacific Tigers baseball players
St. Louis Cardinals players
Spokane Indians players
Texas Rangers coaches
Tri-City Atoms players
University of the Pacific (United States) alumni